Albert Fourvelle (born December 17, 1916, Mabirou) was a Congolese politician. Fourvelle was of mixed African-European heritage. He worked as a trader, and became an active socialist. In 1952 he was elected to the Territorial Assembly (by the second college).

He was re-elected in 1957 as a candidate of the African Socialist Movement (MSA) from Alima-Lefini. On December 8, 1958, he was named a minister in the government of Fulbert Youlou (along with another socialist member of the assembly). The members of his party reacted negatively to him joining Youlou's cabinet, calling it a breach of party discipline. He was expelled from MSA on January 20, 1959. Fourvelle subsequently joined Youlou's UDDIA party.

References

Republic of the Congo politicians
1916 births
Year of death missing